Mystics is a 2003 film starring Milo O'Shea and David Kelly, and directed by David Blair.

References

2003 films
British comedy films
Films scored by Stephen Warbeck
Films directed by David Blair (director)
2000s English-language films
2000s British films